Quercus gambleana is a species of tree in the beech family Fagaceae. It has been found in northeastern India and southwestern China (Guizhou, Hubei, Sichuan, Tibet, Yunnan). It is placed in subgenus Cerris, section Cyclobalanopsis.

References

External links
line drawings, Flora of China Illustrations vol. 4, fig. 383, drawings 3 at upper right and 4 at lower left

gambleana
Flora of Assam (region)
Flora of Bangladesh
Flora of China
Plants described in 1923
Taxa named by Aimée Antoinette Camus